Cape Frances is a cape on the east side of Sturge Island in the Balleny Islands. In 1841, Captain James C. Ross, viewing Sturge Island from a considerable distance, thought it a group of three islands and named the center island, Frances. This error was discovered in 1904 by Captain Robert F. Scott, who applied the name to this cape.

References

Headlands of the Balleny Islands